Eugène Faure, a French painter of allegories, mythological subjects, and portraits, was born at Seyssinet, near Grenoble, in 1822. He studied under David d'Angers and Rude, and his first work, a landscape, now in the Grenoble Museum, appeared at the Salon in 1847. He died in Paris in 1879. The following are his chief works:

Dreams of Youth. 1857.
First Steps in Love. 1861.
Confidence. 1863.
Eve. 1864.
La Source. 1878.

References

 

1822 births
1879 deaths
19th-century French painters
French male painters
People from Isère
19th-century French male artists